Pierce is an unincorporated community in Wharton County, Texas, United States. The community is located along U.S. Highway 59 in central Wharton County, between El Campo and Wharton. The town is named for Abel Head "Shanghai" Pierce, an influential cattleman.  Pierce had an estimated population of 49 in 2000.

History
Shanghai Pierce established the town as a tribute to himself and as an alternative place of business to nearby Wharton. Shanghai funded the construction of a fine hotel meant to anchor commerce and also attempted to have the county seat relocated from Wharton to the town of Pierce. Shanghai's efforts were in vain as the hotel eventually failed and the county seat remained in Wharton. Local folklore states that Shanghai's notorious reputation and local residents' disdain for him resulted in very few hotel patrons which led to the collapse of both hotel and eventually the town itself. In 1895 the name of the town was shortened to Pierce from its original name, Pierce's Station.

Geography

Climate
The climate in this area is characterized by hot, humid summers and generally mild to cool winters.  According to the Köppen Climate Classification system, Pierce has a humid subtropical climate, abbreviated "Cfa" on climate maps.

Education
Public education in the community of Pierce is provided by the El Campo Independent School District and Wharton Independent School District.

References

Unincorporated communities in Wharton County, Texas
Unincorporated communities in Texas